Nikola Ilić (26 February 1985 – 7 December 2012) was a Serbian professional basketball player.

Playing career 
Ilić played for Železničar Čačak, Krka (Slovenia),  Borac Čačak, FMP, and Asesoft Ploiești (Romania). 

In the 2007–08 BLS season, Ilić was honored with both First League MVP and Super League MVP awards.

Death
On 7 December 2012, Ilić died after long battle against cancer at age of 27.

References

External links
 Nikola Ilić at beoexcell.net

1985 births
2012 deaths
ABA League players
Basketball League of Serbia players
Centers (basketball)
Deaths from cancer in Serbia
KK Borac Čačak players
KK FMP (1991–2011) players
KK Železničar Čačak players
People from Ub, Serbia
Power forwards (basketball)
Serbian expatriate basketball people in Romania
Serbian expatriate basketball people in Slovenia
Serbian men's basketball players